Paudie Sheehy (1932–1967) was an Irish sportsperson. He played Gaelic football with John Mitchels and the Kerry county team from 1953 to 1962. He captained Kerry on two occasions.

Early life
Sheehy was the son of footballer John Joe and a brother of Seán Óg and Niall.

Career

Youth
Sheehy first lined out for Kerry at a minor level in 1949. He won a Munster Minor Football Championship medal after a final win over Cork. Sheehy's side later qualified for the All-Ireland Minor Football Championship where they faced Armagh. A 1–07 to 1–05 win saw the title go to the Orchard County.

Sheehy played with Kerry minor again in 1950. He won a Munster Minor Football Championship medal after a final win over Limerick. Sheehy's side later qualified for the All-Ireland Minor Football Championship where they faced Wexford. A 3–06 to 1–04 win over Wexford saw Sheehy pick up a winners medal.

He also played hurling with Kerry at a minor level.

Senior
Sheehy went straight into the Kerry squad in 1951 and made his debut in the Munster Senior Football Championship final win over Cork. He was named at Left Half Forward for the All-Ireland semi-final replay with Mayo, a game Kerry lost.

He played in all of Kerry's 1951–52 National Football League games scoring an impressive 1–15 in six games as Kerry lost the Division 3 final to Cork.

He later made his first Munster start at Left Half Forward, where he scored four points in a 0–14 to 1–07 win over Waterford. He kept his place for the final against Cork. It was a disaster at the Cork Athletic Grounds as the holders crashed out on a 0–11 to 0-02 scoreline. Despite failing to score in the final he was Kerry's second-highest scorer in the championship.

His form kept up during the 1952–53 National Football League. He played in all of Kerry's games as they lost in the semi-final to Cavan. He ended the campaign as Kerry's top scorer with 1-21. At just 21 years old, Sheehy was made the side's captain. He hit 3–03 in a 6–10 to 0-02 semi-final win over Clare. Despite scoring only a single point in the final against Cork, his side did enough to take the title on a 2–07 to 2-03 scoreline.  This gave Sheehy his second Munster medal. In the All-Ireland semi-final Kerry faced Leinster champions Louth. Sheehy gave another good display, marking two points, in a 3–06 to 1–06 win. Kerry faced Armagh in the final. However, a dispute arose over whether Sheehy would start in the final. Things were made more complicated as Sheehy's father John Joe was one of the team's selectors. At the selection meeting before the All-Ireland final, John Joe excused himself when they reached Paudie's position; by the time he returned, his son had been dropped. Jas Murphy led Kerry to a seventeenth title on a 0–13 to 1-06 scoreline. Despite serving as the side's captain at the start of the campaign and their top scorer, Sheehy failed to appear in the game.

Despite scoring in only two of the five games he played during the 1953–54 National Football League, he still finished as Kerry's third-highest scorer with 1-05.

He began the championship in good form with two points in a 3–10 to 1-02 Munster semi-final with over Waterford. He lined out in his fourth championship final when Kerry again faced Cork. Three points from Sheehy saw his side take the title on a 4–09 to 2-03 scoreline and a third Munster medal for him. His contribution of 1–01 in the All-Ireland semi-final with Galway proved to be the difference in a 2–06 to 1–06 win. Sheehy got his chance to line out in a senior final as Kerry squared off with Leinster champions Meath. It wasn't a good day for the Tralee man, however, as he failed to score and Kerry lost on a 1–13 to 1-07 scoreline. 

He played in all of Kerry's 1954–55 National Football League games but his side failed to make the knockout stages.

For the second season in a row, Kerry accounted for Waterford in the Munster. They played Cork again in the final. It was a game that cemented Sheehy as one of the game's top forwards as he hit five points in a 0–14 to 2–06 win and a fourth Munster title. Kerry faced Cavan in the All-Ireland semi-final. In a game where he failed to score the sides ended level. In the replay, two points from Sheehy helped his side get the win at 4–07 to 0–05. Kerry qualified for a third consecutive All-Ireland. In Sheehy's second final Kerry faced the favorite, Dublin. Dublin had drawn attention by dismantling the reigning champions Meath in the final of that year's Leinster Senior Football Championship in what was a twenty-point win. Sheehy managed only a single point, as Jim Brosnan scored two crucial second-half points. He had flown home from New York for the final, where he was studying medicine. After missing out on the 1953 win, Sheehy had his first All-Ireland medal following in his father's footsteps. 

The next few seasons brought no success for Sheehy and Kerry. A  final loss after a re-play came in 1956. Things got worse in 1957 as Kerry suffered a shock loss to Waterford in the Munster semi-final.

In 1958, Kerry returned to the Munster final after a win over Tipperary in the semis. In the final, they again faced Cork where a point from Sheehy helped them to a fifth title in a 2–07 to 0-03 win. In the All-Ireland semi-final, Sheehy faced Derry. The Oak Leaf County had won its first Ulster Senior Football Championship a few weeks before and were underdogs going into the game. Despite two points from Sheehy, Kerry lost out by a single point on a 2–06 to 2-05 scoreline. 

During the 1958–59 National Football League Sheehy played in and scored in all seven Kerry' games, a total of 2–16, as The Kingdom overcame Derry in the final to give Sheehy his first league winners medal.

After overcoming Tipperary for the second year in a row it set up another Munster final with old foes Cork. Sheehy helped himself to 1–01 in Killarney as a 2–15 to 2-08 took him to his sixth Munster title. He put in a five-star display in the All-Ireland semi-final as his three points helped his side take Dublin on 1–10 to 2-05.  Kerry did enough to take the title with 3–07 to 1-04. It was a second title for Sheehy as he was joined by his younger brother Niall.

In 1960, for the second time, Sheehy was named as Kerry captain. For the third year in a row Tipperary were overcome in a game where he scored four points, to set up a novel Munster final with Waterford. He led by example with his contribution of 1-04, a personal best in a Munster final, helping his side to a 3–15 to 0–08 win. It was Sheehy's seventh Munster title and second as captain. In a repeat of the previous All-Ireland final, Kerry overcame Galway 1–08 to 0-08. In the final Kerry faced first timers Down. The Mournemen brought a new style of play with six inter-changeable forwards who introduced off-the-ball running that was no match for the Munster men's traditionalist style and they stormed to a 2–10 to 0–08 win and placed Sheehy as an All-Ireland Runner-up for the second time.

He was in good form during the 1960-61 National Football League scoring 2–06 in six games up to the semi-final replay win over Roscommon. He played no part in that summer's championship.

In the twilight of his career he returned for the 1962 championship. In what was to be his last Munster final at the Cork Athletic Grounds he won his eighth Munster title. He hit two points as Kerry got the better of Dublin in the All-Ireland semi-final.  The All-Ireland against Roscommon was to be a special day for Sheehy and his family. He again lined out with his younger brother Niall and another brother Seán Óg was the side's captain. In what was the first game to be broadcast live on TV Sheehy hit two points as he won a third and final All-Ireland medal 1–12 to 1–06.

The 1962 final was Sheehy's final game with Kerry. Between 1951 and 1962 he played 35 championship games scoring 6-56. He won eight Munster titles, one National Football League and three All-Ireland Senior Football Championship titles.

College
During his college days, he played with University College Cork. He won two Sigerson Cup titles during his time with the Cork side in 1951–52 and again in 1952–53 as captain.

Club
Sheehy played with the John Mitchels club during a golden era for the Tralee side. He played in his first Kerry Senior Football Championship final in 1949 but was on the losing side to Killarney.

He was part of the lineup in a second final in 1951 in another Tralee/Killarney match. This time Sheehy faced Dick Fitzgeralds, but again lost.

They returned to the final again in 1952 when they faced the Kenmare divisional side. In the end, a 3–06 to 0–06 win brought the first title to Sheehy.

The rest of the 1950s brought him little success. However, much success was ahead for the Tralee players.

By the 1959 championship, Paudie was joined by his younger brothers Niall, Seán Óg, and Brian. Mitchels returned to the final for the first time since 1952, where they faced the North Kerry divisional team, Feale Rangers. Paudie's brother Niall saved the Tralee side with a late goal and earned a 1–09 to 2–06 draw. The following April, Mitchels had too much for the North Kerry side as they won out on a 3–09 to 1-10 scoreline. This gave Paudie his second county title.

Mitchels were back in the final in 1960, and they again faced a divisional team, this time West Kerry. The men from the West were favorites. However, the sides ended level and a replay was needed for the second year in a row. It was a disappointment, despite an outstanding display from Sheehy, as the second title in a row went to Tralee 1–11 to 0-03. It was his third medal, and he was team captain.

Sheehy played in the third final in a row and second in 1961, including the delayed 1960 final, in the first all-Tralee clash since 1936 with Kerins O'Rahilly's. A 2–09 to 0-08 score produced Sheehy's third title in a row and fourth overall.

The Mitchels again reached the final in 1962, and for the third time in four seasons, their opponents were a divisional team again facing Feale Rangers. As in 1960, the sides couldn't be separated, despite Mitchels lead going into added time, as a late score by Rangers saw the sides finish level on a 2–08 to 1-11 scoreline. In the replay, Sheehy and his team made history as the title came to Tralee for the fourth year in a row and Sheehy won his fifth medal.

In 1963, the Mitchels qualified for a fifth final in a row. They faced Kerins O'Rahilly's. A fifth title came after a 4–04 to 2–03 win. It was Sheehy's sixth and final medal - a record that stood until 2017.

Honours

College
University College Cork
 Sigerson Cup (2) 1951–52, 1952–53 (c)

Club
John Mitchels
Kerry Senior Football Championship (6): 1952, 1959, 1960(c), 1961, 1962, 1963

County
Kerry
Munster Senior Football Championship (8): 1951, 1953 (c), 1954, 1955, 1958, 1960 (c), 1961, 1962
All-Ireland Senior Football Championship (3): 1955, 1959, 1962
National Football League (1) 1959
Munster Minor Football Championship (2) 1949, 1950
All-Ireland Minor Football Championship (1) 1950

References

 

1932 births
1967 deaths
All-Ireland-winning captains (football)
Dual players
John Mitchels (Kerry) Gaelic footballers
Kerry hurlers 
Kerry inter-county Gaelic footballers
Munster inter-provincial Gaelic footballers
Paudie
UCC Gaelic footballers